The Star Model Z62 is a submachine gun of Spanish origin which was developed to replace the Star Model Z45 in 1962.

Overview
The Star Model Z62 is a blow-back operated firearm which fires from an open bolt. Earlier variants came with a double crescent trigger for single and full auto.

Users

See also
Weapons of the Salvadoran Civil War
Beretta M12
Agram 2000
Interdynamic MP-9

References

9mm Parabellum submachine guns
Submachine guns of Spain